Event: Slalom Ladies

Date: February 16, 2007

1st Run Start Time: 17:00 CET

2nd Run Start Time: 20:00 CET

Results

Notes 

Women's Slalom
2007 in Swedish women's sport